The BET Award for Best International Act is an award given to honor the outstanding achievements of international artists from around the world every year.

Winners and nominees
Winners are listed first and highlighted in bold.

2010s

2020s

References

Awards established in 2018
BET Awards